This is a complete list of appearances by members of the professional playing squad of UE Lleida during the 1998–99 season.

1999
Lleida
Lleida
Lleida